Iulia Antoanella Motoc is a Romanian judge and international law expert, currently a Judge at the European Court of Human Rights and a professor at the University of Bucharest. Before beginning her service at the Court, she served as a Judge at the Constitutional Court of Romania. Motoc was UN Special Rapporteur for the Democratic Republic of the Congo and she chaired a number of international experts bodies and was Vice-President of the UN Human Rights Committee. On 1 October 2013, the Parliamentary Assembly of the Council of Europe elected Motoc a Judge of the European Court of Human Rights with respect to Romania. She received an absolute majority of votes cast by parliamentarians. Her nine-year term of office began on December 18, 2013. In August 2021, she was elected as a member of the Institut de Droit International

Early life and education 

Iulia Motoc was born in Timișoara. She graduated from the School of Law at the University of Bucharest. Iulia Antoanella Motoc holds a master's degree from the Paul Cézanne University School of Law, Aix-Marseille (1991) a doctorate in international law from Paul Cézanne University, Aix-Marseille (summa cum laude) in 1996 an habilitation in law from Jean Monnet Department University of Paris-Sud (1998) in and a doctorate in ethics from the University of Bucharest, Department of Philosophy (1999). Iulia Motoc was fellow in philosophy to the Institut für die Wissenschaften vom Menschen, Vienna (1999) and to the Yale School of Law (2004–2007).

Career

In Romania

Iulia Motoc was a magistrate in Romania, prosecutor, and judge (1989–1995) in criminal law. In 1995 she passed the full registration exam for judges in civil and criminal law. In 1996 she was admitted as a lawyer in the Bucharest Bar. After which she joined the University of Bucharest, as a teaching assistant and later becoming a full Professor in 2002. 
She was a member of the Presidential Commission for Analysis of the Constitution (2007–2008) and rapporteur for the chapter on human rights. Motoc was elected judge at the Constitutional Court of Romania in 2010. She adjudicated on the constitutionality of laws and decided on exceptions brought to the Courts of law as to the unconstitutionality of laws and orders in civil and criminal law She held this position until she became a judge at the European Court of Human Rights at the end of 2013.

UNCHR career and other international activities

Iulia Motoc became a member of the United Nations Subcommission on Human Rights in 1996, first as an alternate and in 2000–2001 she served as a President of United Nations Subcommission on Human Rights. She has co-authored the Working Paper on Free, Prior and Informed Consent of the Indigenous People which was incorporated in the  UN Declaration for Indigenous People. Motoc was on the co-author of the UN Guidelines principles for Extreme poverty. She was the UN Special Rapporteur on Human Rights and the Human Genome, author of the first reports of the United Nations in the field of genetics (2004–2007).

She was UN Special Rapporteur on Human Rights for the Democratic Republic of Congo (2001–2004). In this capacity she has visited the Democratic Republic of Congo in a conflict area and she has reported on the massive violations of human rights quoted including by International Criminal Court Prosecutor.

Iulia Motoc was elected member of the Advisory Committee for the Protection of National Minorities (1998–2004) and (2008–2012). 
She was a member of the Fundamental Rights Agency of the European Union (2010–2012) and Motoc was also an arbiter with ICSID, Washington (2008–2014).

Academic career 

Iulia Motoc is Professor of International Law and European Law at the University of Bucharest since 2002. She was Director (Romania) of the European Master on Human Rights and Democratization, European Inter-University Centre for Human Rights and Democratization, Venise (2007–2015). Iulia Motoc was teaching at New York University School of Law (2002–2003) where she was  Senior Jean Monnet Fellow. She has also taught at St-Thomas University in Miami (2001–2003) and she was Special Guest Professor at the European Academy oh Human Rights at the European Institute in Florence (2006). Iulia Motoc is Research Professor, Institute for Research in International and European Law, Sorbonne (2012–2014). At the European Court of Human Rights, Iulia Motoc has created a group of international law. She also initiated joint conferences between the European Society of International Law and the European Court of Human Rights.

European Court of Human Rights 
Motoc started her term as a judge of the European Court of Human Rights on 18 December 2013. In 2022, her dissenting opinion for the case of N. v. Romania was voted as the best separate opinion of the year 2021 by Strasbourg Observers. According to Strasbourg Observers:

She was cited in a report for possible conflict of interest as she seated in three cases in which the International Commission of Jurists(ICJ) intervened as third party. Iulia Motoc was indeed a member of the ICJ board from 2008 to 2013.

Lectures 
 The Influence of the European Court of Human Rights on Human Rights Regimes in Central and Eastern Europe in the Lecture Series of the United Nations Audiovisual Library of International Law

Selected publications

 Migration and the European Convention on Human Rights (co-editors Ledi Bianku and Basak Cali), Oxford University Press, forthcoming 2020
 The ECHR and General International Law, Oxford University Press, 2018 (co-editor Anne van Aaken)
 New Developments in Constitutional Law, Eleven International Publishing
 The impact of the European Court of Human Rights and the case-law of democratic change and development in Eastern Europe, editors Iulia Motoc and Ineta Ziemele, Cambridge University, 2016;
 Internationalist doctrines during real communism in Europe, UMR Comparative Law, Sorbonne, Society of Comparative Legislation Publishing House, 2012 (co-editor Emmanuelle Jouannet);
 Women's rights as human rights from universal to regional, University of Bucharest, 2009, (ed.);
The International Law of Genetic Discrimination: The Power of "Never Again" in Thérèse Murphy (ed.), New Technologies and Human Rights, Oxford University Press, Oxford, 2009;
 Pleading for Human Rights, Centre for Human Rights and Humanitarian Law, University Pantheon-Assas II, University of Bucharest Publishing House, 2008 (in French);
 Conception of Pluralism and International Law in E. Jouannet, H.R. Fabri V. Tomcievitz, ESIL procedures, Selected Procedures of European Society of International Law, What's the use for *International Law, Hart, Oxford, 2008;
 State and Individual Responsibility: controversial aspects of the right to democracy, in The State's Responsibility, Academy of International Law, Thesaurus Acroasium, Sakkoulas, Thessaloniki, 2006;
 The role of the UN Special Rapporteurs in relation to States, in Emmanuel Decaux, United Nations and Human Rights, Pedone Publishing House, Paris, 2006;
 About Democracy: Normative Challenges to the International Legal System, in S.Griller (eds.), International Economic Governance and Non-Economic Issues, Springer Wien New York, 2003 (co-author G.H.H. Weiler);
 Public International Law, University of Bucharest, 1996, reprint, 2002 (co-author) (in French);
 Use of Force in Public International Law, Exceptions to Article 2*4 of the UN Charter in the practice of the Security Council, Babel Publishing House, Bucharest, 1997 (in French).

Honors 
 National Order "Star of Romania" in the rank of Knight;
 Order of Saints Constantine and Helena;

See also 
 European Court of Human Rights
 University of Bucharest
 Council of Europe

Personal life 
Iulia Antoanella Motoc is married to former Minister of Defense Mihnea Motoc, and they have a son.

In her free time, she has written and published a short fiction novel at the end of 2020, "Maria Și Machiavelli".

References 
 K. Koufa, Preface, Pladoyer pour les droits de l'homme, Universite Pantheon-Assas Paris 2, Universite de Bucharest, 2008 
 Challenges in Aid to Rape Victims: the Case of the Democratic Republic of the Congo
 M BOSMANS – Essex Human Rights Review, 2007
 Frankfurter Allgemeine Zeitung on 19 June 2006
 S Zleptnig – International and Comparative Law Quarterly, 2008 – Cambridge Univ Press
 J Carino – Arizona Journal of International and Comparative Law, 2005 – R McMahon – Transitions Online, 2005 – CEEOL

References

External links 
 European Court of Human Rights Site

Constitutional Court of Romania judges
United Nations Human Rights Committee members
Aix-Marseille University alumni
Living people
Members of the Sub-Commission on the Promotion and Protection of Human Rights
Members of the Advisory Committee of the Framework Convention for the Protection of National Minorities
Romanian women lawyers
United Nations special rapporteurs
1967 births
Constitutional court women judges
Romanian women judges
Judges of the European Court of Human Rights
Romanian officials of the United Nations
Romanian judges of international courts and tribunals
Knights of the Order of the Star of Romania
Members of the Institut de Droit International